MBHS may refer to:

 Madhavrao Bhagwat High School, a private secondary school in VileParle India
 McKinney Boyd High School, a public high school located in McKinney, Texas
 Miami Beach High School, a public high school located in Miami Beach, Florida
 Monsignor Bonner High School, an all-male Catholic high school in the Archdiocese of Philadelphia
 Montgomery Blair High School, a public high school located in Montgomery County, Maryland
 Mount Blue High School, a public high school located in Farmington, Maine
 Mountain Brook High School, a public high school located in Mountain Brook, Alabama
 Murry Bergtraum High School, a public high school located in New York City
 Myrtle Beach High School, a public high school located in Myrtle Beach, South Carolina
 Morant Bay High School, a public high school located in Morant Bay, St. Thomas, Jamaica, West Indies
 Mission Bay High School, a public high school located in San Diego, California
 Mount Baker High School, a public high school located in Deming, Washington
 Morro Bay High School, a public high school located in Morro Bay, California